Vencer is a Dutch niche manufacturer of sports cars. It was founded in 2010 by Robert Cobben. Their current lineup includes the Vencer Sarthe. The hand-built 2015 Sarthe retails from €270,882 and is only available in Europe.

References

Car manufacturers of the Netherlands 
Dutch companies established in 2010
Vehicle manufacturing companies established in 2010